Gədəzeyxur (also, Gedazeykhur) is a village and municipality in the Qusar Rayon of Azerbaijan.  It has a population of 2,225.

References 

Populated places in Qusar District